Olympias (c. 375–316 BC) was the fourth wife of Philip II of Macedon and mother of Alexander the Great.

Olympias may also refer to:

People
 Olympias II of Epirus, 3rd century BC queen and regent of Epirus
 Olympias of Thebes, Greek medical writer and midwife
 Olympias (Herodian), daughter of Herod the Great
 Olympias of Armenia (died 361), Christian Roman noblewoman, one of the wives of King Arsaces II (Arshak II) of Armenia 
 Olympias (sister of Praetorian prefect Seleucus), Seleucus being the father of Olympias the Deaconess
 Olympias the Deaconess (ca. 361/368–408), Christian Roman saint and noblewoman, niece of Olympias of Armenia
 Olympias (daughter of Robert Guiscard), 11th-century fiancée of the Byzantine co-emperor Constantine Doukas

Sports teams
 Olympias Frenarou, a volleyball team based in Frenaros, Famagusta District, Cyprus
 Olympias Lympion, a football club based in Lympia, Cyprus
 A.E.P. Olympias Patras, a multi-sport club in Patras, Greece
 Olympias Patras B.C., a professional basketball club

Other uses
 Olympias (trireme), a reconstruction of an ancient Athenian trireme
 Olympias (Thessaly), a town in ancient Thessaly
 Olympias mine, in northern Greece

Olympias